Žabeni (Macedonian Cyrillic: Жабени) is a village in the municipality of Bitola, North Macedonia. It used to be part of the former municipality of Bistrica. It is a village 9.71 kilometers away from Bitola, which is the second largest city in the country.

Demographics
Žabeni is attested in the Ottoman defter of 1467/68 as a village in the vilayet of Manastir. The inhabitants attested primarily bore typical Albanian anthroponyms, such as  Gjergj, Gjin and Gjon alongside a mix of Christian and Slavic ones.

As of the 2021 census, Žabeni had 144 residents with the following ethnic composition:
Albanians 120
Macedonians 14
Persons for whom data are taken from administrative sources 10

According to the 2002 census, the village had a total of 178 inhabitants. Ethnic groups in the village include:
Albanians 143 
Macedonians 3
Others 5

References

External links

Villages in Bitola Municipality
Albanian communities in North Macedonia